Erumaipatti is a panchayat town in Namakkal district  in the state of Tamil Nadu, India. It is the headquarter of the Erumaipatti block.

Demographics
 India census, Erumaipatti had a population of 9303. Males constitute 51% of the population and females 49%. Erumaipatti has an average literacy rate of 71%, higher than the national average of 59.5%: male literacy is 79%, and female literacy is 63%. In Erumaipatti, 10% of the population is under 6 years of age.

References

Cities and towns in Namakkal district